No Shape is the fourth studio album by American singer-songwriter Perfume Genius, released on May 5, 2017, through Matador Records as the follow up to Too Bright (2014).

Background
Hadreas was featured on the cover of the March–April 2017 issue of The Fader, which included a lengthy feature on Hadreas and his work on the next album. In the weeks following the article, Hadreas posted a number of video and audio clips teasing new music. On March 21, 2017 Hadreas announced his fourth studio album No Shape and released the first single "Slip Away", which was accompanied by a music video directed by frequent Björk collaborator Andrew Thomas Huang. The single was designated "Best New Track" by Pitchfork. On April 19, Hadreas released another single from the album called "Go Ahead" during a live Twitter Q&A with fans. On May 9, 2017 Perfume Genius released the video for "Die 4 You", directed by Floria Sigismondi.

Reception

Accolades

The album received a Grammy Award nomination for “Best Engineered Album, Non-Classical” at the 60th Annual Grammy Awards. Additionally, it was noted as one of the works designated under producer Blake Mills’ nomination for “Producer of the Year, Non-Classical.”

Track listing

Personnel
Performance

 Mike Hadreas – vocals , piano , synthesizer , Wurlitzer , trumpet noises , congregation vocals 
 Blake Mills – piano , synthesizer , vocals , marimba , guitars , drums , percussion , tablas , bass , baritone guitar , Marxophone , programming , Mellotron , guitarron , organ , kora , celeste , Omnichord , woodwinds , congregation vocals 
 Stuart Johnson –  drums , percussion , cymbals ,
 Rob Moose – violin , viola , string arrangements 
 Alan Wyffels – backing vocals , synthesizer , vocals , Rhodes piano , piano 
 Natalie Mering – vocals 
 Pino Palladino – bass 
 Chris Dave – drums , percussion 
 Shawn Everett – synthesizer 
 Joseph Lorge – congregation vocals 
 Clay Blair – congregation vocals 
 Becca Luce – congregation vocals 
 Chris Doerr – congregation vocals 

Production

 Blake Mills – production
 Shawn Everett – engineering, mixing
 Joseph Lorge – engineering
 Clay Blair – studio assistance
 Omar Yakar – studio assistance
 Brendan Dekora – studio assistance
 Patricia Sullivan – mastering
 Inez and Vinoodh – artwork
 Mike Zimmerman – design

Charts

References

2017 albums
Perfume Genius albums
Matador Records albums
Albums produced by Blake Mills
Experimental pop albums